"Tonight Looks Good on You" is a song written by Rhett Akins, Ashley Gorley, and Dallas Davidson and recorded by American country music artist Jason Aldean. It was released on March 23, 2015 as the third single from Aldean's 2014 album Old Boots, New Dirt.

Critical reception
A review in Taste of Country was favorable, saying that "There’s something dangerous about Jason Aldean’s new single 'Tonight Looks Good on You,' and many of the love songs found on Old Boots, New Dirt. The story is familiar, but his delivery is unique and sincere." and "Lyrically the song separates itself from his previous late-night love songs".

Music video
The music video was directed by Mason Dixon and premiered in May 2015. It shows Aldean performing the song by himself in a warehouse back lot at night, and in a separate scene surrounded by many strobe lights. Between this is a storyline about a man who is working overtime at a factory who desperately longs to go home to his wife. After he is scolded by his boss for not paying attention to his job, he notices another worker (played by Aldean) who is just getting off. After discussing his issue, Aldean agrees to finish the job for him so he can get home. Meanwhile, his wife is seen at home desperately waiting for his return as she is getting ready to go out with him. After packing up his things, he finally returns home in a pickup truck and she jumps into his arms; the two then enjoy their date. Back at the factory, the boss returns only to see Aldean finishing the job the main character was supposed to finish. Shocked, the boss leaves without saying a word, leaving Aldean to finish the job.

Chart performance
The song has sold 529,000 copies in the US as of September 2015.

Year-end charts

References

2014 songs
2015 singles
Jason Aldean songs
BBR Music Group singles
Songs written by Dallas Davidson
Songs written by Rhett Akins
Songs written by Ashley Gorley
Song recordings produced by Michael Knox (record producer)